Sam Harrison may refer to:
 Sam Harrison (cyclist) (born 1992), Welsh racing cyclist
 Sam Harrison (rugby union) (born 1990), English rugby union player

See also
 Samantha Harrison (born 1991), New Zealand field hockey player
 Samuel Harrison (disambiguation)